Torin Ferguson (born 29 July 1985 in the Bahamas) is a footballer who plays as a goalkeeper. He currently plays for BFA Senior League club Bears and the Bahamas national football team.

Club career
In 2004, he signed with BFA Senior League club Bears.

International career
He made his debut for the Bahamas national football team in a September 2006 Caribbean Cup qualification match against Cuba, coming on as a sub for Dwayne Whylly. He also plays for the national beach soccer team.

References

External links
 Profile – Bahamas FA

1985 births
Living people
Bahamian footballers
Bahamas international footballers
Association football goalkeepers
Bears FC players
BFA Senior League players
Beach soccer players